Louis Andlauer (7 September 1876 – 18 July 1915) was a French composer and organist.

Biography 
Louis Andlauer wrote organ and harmonium pieces, three masses, a cantata, religious motets and several songs.

Organist and director of music at the Parisian church of Saint-Éloi, he was also a substitute for Louis Vierne from 1912 to 1914 at the organ of Notre-Dame de Paris.

Bibliography 
  Biographical notes in Joseph Joubert, Maîtres contemporains de l'orgue, Paris, Senart, 1912, vol. 1, (p. 1)

References

External links 
 
  Deux Pieces Breves No.1 - Louis Andlauer on YouTube

1876 births
People from Honfleur
1915 deaths
French classical organists
French male organists
French composers of sacred music
20th-century French composers
French male composers
20th-century French male musicians
French military personnel killed in World War I
Male classical organists